The Snettisham hydroelectric power plant is a 78 MW power plant located 28 miles south of central Juneau, Alaska and accessible only by boat or seaplane. The power plant is fed by two lakes that are tapped from below, negating the need for a traditional dam.  As of December 2017 it supplies 78% of the electricity for Alaska Electric Light & Power.  It is connected to Juneau by a 44-mile transmission line.

It was completed in 1973.

References

Hydroelectric power plants in Alaska
Buildings and structures in Juneau, Alaska
United States local public utility dams
Dams in Alaska
Energy infrastructure completed in 1973
1973 establishments in Alaska